Charalampos "Babis" Petrakos (born 1 October 1991) is a Greek footballer who is currently a free agent.

Career
Born in Sparti, Laconia, Petrakos began playing football as a youth for Atromitos Diavatou. As central midfielder he had about 75 appearances and 35 goals at youth level.

He joined Naoussa F.C. in 2009 where in two years he had 45 appearances and 10 goals as central midfielder and defender.

In 2011, he joined Pontioi Katerinis F.C. participating in Football League 2 (Greece). 
Petrakos made his debut for Pontioi Katerinis F.C. and in professional league football against Megas Alexandros Irakleia F.C.
In the Greek Cup he played against Vyzas F.C. and also started in the cup against Xanthi but was replaced at half time.

Ιn the middle of the year Pontioi Katerinis F.C. merged with Iraklis F.C. The new team was named AEP Iraklis 1908 and Babis Petrakos continued as a member of the new squad. He was released on 6 April 2012.

References

External links
Profile at EPAE.org

1991 births
Living people
Greek footballers
Association football midfielders
A.P.S. Zakynthos players
Naoussa F.C. players
Sportspeople from Sparta, Peloponnese
Footballers from the Peloponnese